Rok Drakšič (born 7 June 1987 in Griže, Žalec) is a Slovenian judoka.

At the 2008 Summer Olympics he competed in the extra-lightweight category (-60 kg), losing to Masoud Akhondzadeh in his first match.

At the 2012 Summer Olympics he competed in the half-lightweight category (-66 kg).  He beat Ricardo Valderrama by ko-uchi-gari, but then lost to eventual silver medalist Miklós Ungvári.

After his competition career, he became head coach of the Finnish National Team where he has produced excellent results, and achieved Finland's first World Tour medals in eight years.

Achievements

References

External links

 
 Rok Drakšič in Judo club Sankaku 

1987 births
Living people
Slovenian male judoka
Judoka at the 2008 Summer Olympics
Judoka at the 2012 Summer Olympics
Judoka at the 2016 Summer Olympics
Olympic judoka of Slovenia
Judoka at the 2015 European Games
European Games medalists in judo
European Games bronze medalists for Slovenia
Mediterranean Games silver medalists for Slovenia
Mediterranean Games bronze medalists for Slovenia
Competitors at the 2005 Mediterranean Games
Competitors at the 2009 Mediterranean Games
Mediterranean Games medalists in judo
21st-century Slovenian people